Trebacosa europaea is a wolf spider species in the genus Trebacosa found in France, Hungary, Belarus and Greece.

See also 
 List of Lycosidae species

References

External links 

Lycosidae
Spiders of Europe
Spiders described in 2007